Love addiction is a proposed model of pathological passion-related behavior involving the feeling of falling and being in love. A medical review of related behaviors in animals and humans concluded that current medical evidence does not have definitions or criteria on an addiction model for love addiction, but there are reported similarities to substance dependence, such as euphoria and desire in the stimuli (drug intoxication), as well as anhedonia and negative levels of mood when away from the stimuli (drug withdrawal), intrusive thoughts on it, and disregard for adverse consequences. There has never been a reference to love addiction in the Diagnostic and Statistical Manual of Mental Disorders (DSM), a compendium of mental disorders and diagnostic criteria published by the American Psychiatric Association.

Medical research on love addiction is still ongoing today, and it has not yet been scientifically confirmed whether or not it is an addiction.

History

The modern history of the concept of the love addict – ignoring such precursors as Robert Burton's dictum that 'love extended is mere madness' – extends to the early decades of the 20th century. Freud's study of the Wolf Man highlighted 'his liability to compulsive attacks of falling physically in love ... a compulsive falling in love that came on and passed off by sudden fits'; but it was Sandor Rado who in 1928 first popularized the term "love addict" – 'a person whose needs for more love, more succor, more support grow as rapidly as the frustrated people around her try to fill up what is, in effect, a terrible and unsatisfiable inner emptiness.' Even Søren Kierkegaard in Works of Love said "Spontaneous [romantic] love makes a man free and in the next moment dependent ... spontaneous love can become unhappy, can reach the point of despair."

However, it was not until the 1970s and 1980s that the concept came to the popular fore. Stanton Peele opened the door, almost unwittingly, with his 1975 book Love and Addiction; but (as he later explained), while that work had been intended as 'a social commentary on how our society defines and patterns intimate relationships ... all of this social dimension has been removed, and the attention to love addiction has been channeled in the direction of regarding it as an individual, treatable psychopathology'.  In 1976, the 12-Step program Sex and Love Addicts Anonymous (S.L.A.A.) started hosting weekly meetings based on Alcoholics Anonymous. They published their Basic Text, Sex and Love Addicts Anonymous, in 1986 discussing characteristics of and recovery from both love addiction and sex addiction. As of late 2012, S.L.A.A.'s membership had grown to an estimated 16,000 members in 43 countries. In 1985, Robin Norwood's Women Who Love Too Much popularized the concept of love addiction for women. In 2004 a program just for love addicts was created--Love Addicts Anonymous. Since, variations on the dynamics of love addiction have become further popularized in the 1990s and 2000s by multiple authors.

Cultural examples
 In A Spy in the House of Love, the heroine Sabina is said to have seen her 'love anxieties as resembling those of a drug addict, of alcoholics, of gamblers. The same irresistible impulse, tension, compulsion and then depression following the yielding to the impulse'. As a result, she has subsequently been described as 'feeling like a "love addict" enslaved to obsessive-compulsive patterns of behaviour'.
 P. G. Wodehouse features in The Inimitable Jeeves 'a character called Bingo who on about every third page meets a wonderful new woman who is going to save his life and is better than any woman he has ever met before, and then of course it flops ... a new burst of life, but it does not last'.
 St. Augustine – 'to Carthage then I came, where a cauldron of unholy loves sang all about my ears' – has been interpreted as being, 'fundamentally, what one might call a "love addict"', with a disturbing tendency 'to invest all of himself in relationships and to "forget himself" in the intensity of his affection'.
Splendor in the Grass [both the poem and the movie] are about love addiction Natalie Wood went into a mental institution when her boyfriend left her. 
"What though the radiance which was once so bright. 
Be now for ever taken from my sight. 
Though nothing can bring back the hour 
of splendour in the grass, of glory in the flower; 
we will grieve not, rather find :Strength in what remains behind; :in the primal sympathy which having been must ever be; 
in the soothing thoughts that spring.  
Out of human suffering;
in the faith that looks through death; 
in years that bring the philosophic mind." 
– William Wordsworth

See also
 Codependence
 Disease model of addiction
 Limerence
 Obsessive love
 Unrequited love
 Yandere

References

Further reading
Books
 Love and Addiction by Stanton Peele, PhD. (New American Library, 1975) 
 Sex and Love Addicts Anonymous: The Basic Text for the Augustine Fellowship (Augustine Fellowship, 1986) 
 Women, Sex, and Addiction: A Search for Love and Power by Charlotte Davis. (William Morrow Paperbacks, 1990) 
 When You Love too Much by Stephen Arterburn (Regal, 1991)  
 Facing Love Addiction: Giving Yourself the Power to Change the Way You Love by Pia Mellody. (HarperOne, 1992) 
 The Betrayal Bond: Breaking Free of Exploitive Relationships by Patrick Carnes, PhD. (HCI, 1997) 
 Confusing Love with Obsession: When Being in Love Means Being in Control by John D Moore. (Hazelden, 2006) 
 Surviving Withdrawal: The Breakup Workbook for Love Addicts by Jim Hall, MS (Health C., 2011) 
 Love Addict: Sex, Romance, and Other Dangerous Drugs by Ethlie Ann Vare. (HCI, 2011) 
 Making Advances: A Comprehensive Guide for Treating Female Sex and Love Addictions  (SASH, 2012) 
 “Is It Love, or Is It Addiction” by Brenda Schaeffer. (Hazelden, 2009) 

Articles
 Strung Out on Love and Checked In for Treatment
 2008 article: Love addiction – how to break it

External links 
 
 

Love